Dolphin Rugby Football Club is a rugby union club in Cork. It was founded in 1902, by members of Dolphin Swimming Club seeking to find a wintertime activity. They play in Division 2A of the All-Ireland League.

Former Irish Coach, Declan Kidney played for the club in the 1980s and early 1990s.

Michael Kiernan, with 43, is the club's most capped international player. J S McCarthy and Terry Kingston both captained Ireland. Tomás O'Leary was the scrum half on Ireland's 2009 Grandslam winning team.
The club's top try scorer in The AIB League & Cup is James Coughlan with 37, Coughlan was captain of the Munster side that beat Australia.

Honours
All Ireland League Division 2 Champions 2003 
 Munster Senior Cup Winners (6): 1921, 1931, 1944–45, 1948 and 1956.
 Munster Junior Cup (4):1913, 1923, 1926, 1944.
Munster Junior Plate: 1985.
Munster Under 20 League: 1984. 
 Munster Senior League: (8) 1924, 1926, 1929, 1949, 1955, 1956, 1973 and 1991.

Notable Past Players
The following have represented Ireland at full international level whilst playing with Dolphin;

IRFU Presidents
1955/56   C J Hanrahan
1973/74   I F Mahony
1983/84   G F Reidy

Current Munster-Contracted Players
Niall Scannell
Rory Scannell

References

External links
Dolphin RFC's Official website

Irish rugby union teams
Rugby union clubs in County Cork
Senior Irish rugby clubs (Munster)
1902 establishments in Ireland
Rugby clubs established in 1902